Johann Salomon Wahl (1689, Chemnitz - 5 December 1765, Copenhagen) was a German artist who became a court painter in Denmark.

Biography
He trained as a painter between 1705 and 1711 with David Hoyer (1667-1720), the court painter in Leipzig. After that, he settled in Hamburg, where he worked as a portrait painter for the Holstein. In 1719, he was called to Denmark to work for the Danish Royal Family.

When Christian VI ascended the throne in 1730, Wahl was appointed as court painter. In 1737, he took over the administration of the Royal Collection. In 1744, he became an honorary member of the Accademia di Belle Arti di Firenze. 

He was among the first Northern artists to apply the new French styles of portrait painting, emphasizing one's position in society rather than their personality, although his portraits of those outside the nobility tended to be freer in style.

References

 Altona Museum: The King's School speaks Latin. 250 years Christianeum 1738-1988. Exhibition catalog, Hamburg 1988, Cat No. 19, pp.132f

1689 births
1765 deaths
People from Chemnitz
18th-century Danish painters
18th-century male artists
Danish male painters
18th-century German painters
18th-century German male artists
German male painters
Court painters